Galium mahadivense, is a species of plant in the family Rubiaceae. It is native to Jammu and Kashmir, in disputed territory administered by India but claimed by Pakistan.

Galium mahadivense was originally described from a site near the city of Srinagar.

References

External links

mahadivense
Flora of Jammu and Kashmir
Plants described in 1976